Mushtaq Ahmad Mahar is a Pakistani civil servant and police officer who served as Inspector General of Sindh Police from February 2020 to May 2022. On 18 May 2022, Mahar was removed as Sindh's Inspector General.

References

Living people
Pakistani police officers
Inspector Generals of Sindh Police
Year of birth missing (living people)